Scott Bond is a trance music artist, producer, and promoter from Birmingham, England, who began DJing in 1989. He started out DJing at venues such as Cream, Miss Moneypenny's, Fun and Gatecrasher, which he co-founded. He has toured internationally with Gatecrasher. He was voted World's Finest Resident DJ in the Mixmag Dance Awards.

Scott Bond, John Purser, Darren Hodson and Nick Rose have also recorded under the name Q:Dos, producing and writing dance tracks as well as re-mixing for most of the major dance labels. Scott has also worked on many tracks with Solarstone. One of his most critically acclaimed releases has been in collaboration with Solarstone, a track called "Third Earth" [more commonly known as 3rd Earth].

One of his mix albums is called Gatecrasher Wet.

His most recent production Airfoil is a collaboration with Marc Mitchell, and was released in September 2014.

References

External links
 Official website
 Scott Bond at Discogs
 Scott Bond at The DJ List
 Interview with Scott Bond (Oct 2014) by Trancefixxed

Club DJs
English record producers
Living people
Year of birth missing (living people)
Musicians from Birmingham, West Midlands
English trance musicians
English DJs
Electronic dance music DJs